Legrand is a Swedish band from Malmö. 
The band was formed in Lund 1999 under the name Hype by the members Anders Tillaeus, Sinisa Krnjaic, Martin Lundgren and Mats Wallander. The following year, Anders' older brother Fredrik Tillaeus became a member and the band moved to Malmö. 2001 Mats was replaced by Martin’s younger brother Fabian Lundgren, and the same year, the band changed its name to Legrand. Their first album was released in October 2005.

Members 
 Anders Tillaeus – Vocals and guitar 
 Fredrik Tillaeus – Keyboards
 Sinisa Krnjaic – Bass and back-up vocals 
 Fabian Lundgren - Guitar 
 Martin Lundgren - Drums 
 Mats Wallander (1999-2001) - Guitar

Discography

Album
LeGrand (2005), RoastingHouse Records/Playground Music
Sidewalks & stations (2007), RoastingHouse Records/Universal Music

Singles 
 One quick look (2005) 
 Brainy (2007)
 Brainy (2008, LTD Edition, vinyl)

Video
 One quick look (2005) 
 Brainy (2007)

Associated Acts
 Drabness (Anders, Sinisa and Martin)
 Cruzin With Elvis In Bigfoot USA (Anders, Sinisa, Martin and Mats)
 Conway (Anders and Sinisa)
 Apple Core (Martin and Anders)
 Rosvo (Martin)
 Left Right Left (Martin)

External links
 Official website
 Official space

Swedish musical groups
Musical groups from Malmö